The 2016–17 season is Dinamo Zagreb's 26th season in the Croatian First Division and 105th year in existence as a football club.

This season was an extremely unsuccessful one for the club, losing both the league title and cup title to rivals HNK Rijeka and also failing to score a single goal in the 2016–17 UEFA Champions League group stage, in all six matches they played.

Squad

Competitions

Overview

Competitions

MAXtv Prva Liga

League table

Results summary

Results by round

Matches

Croatian Cup

UEFA Champions League

Matches

Player seasonal records
Updated 31 May 2017. Competitive matches only.

Goals

Source: Competitive matches

References

2016–17
Croatian football clubs 2016–17 season
Dinamo Zagreb